Bole (bòo pikkà, also known as Bolanchi, Ampika, Borpika, Bolewa, Bolawa) is a West Chadic language spoken in Nigeria.  Dialects include Bara and Fika, spoken in the Fika Emirate.

Writing System

Notes

Further reading

Alhaji Maina Gimba.  2000.  "Bole Verb Morphology," University of California, Los Angeles PhD dissertation.
Bole-English-Hausa dictionary 
English-Bole Wordlist 
Papers and Other Works on Bole from UCLA 
OLAC resources in and about the Bole language

West Chadic languages
Languages of Nigeria